Rema or REMA may refer to:

Places 
 Rema, Ethiopia, village in Amhara province, Ethiopia
 Rema Island, an island in Lake Tana, Ethiopia

People 

 Rema (musician), Nigerian musician
 Rema Namakula, Ugandan singer
 Moses Isserles (1520–1572), a rabbi known as The Rema

Other uses 
 Rema (moth)
 Rema (EP), 2019 eponymous extended play by Rema
 Rema language, a language of New Guinea
 Rema S. A., a Polish manufacturing company
 Reference Elevation Model of Antarctica (REMA)

See also 
 REMA 1000, a supermarket chain
 Rema-Rema, an English music group
 Remas, a village and a former municipality in Albania